Webster is a neighborhood of the Mid-City region of San Diego, California.

Geography
Webster is located just east of Golden Hill, west of the city of Lemon Grove, north of National City, and south of the City Heights neighborhood. Its borders are defined by Home Avenue to the Northwest, Euclid Avenue to the East, and State Route 94 to the South.  The community also houses several family owned Mexican restaurants, a McDonald's, Popeyes Chicken, Pizza Hut, Subway and one of the oldest Jack in the Box outlets in San Diego.  Other major businesses include Cox Cable San Diego, Coca-Cola Bottling, and KGTV 10 News (the local ABC affiliate).

The unofficial nickname for the community is "The Web".

Education
 Webster Elementary School (San Diego Unified School District)

Neighborhoods in San Diego